Auratus can refer to:

Jean Daurat (or Dorat) (1508 – 1588), a French poet and influential classical scholar
Pierre Doré (c.1500 – 1559), a French Dominican theologian

A Latin word often used in taxonomy for species names. Auratus comes from the Latin root aurat-, meaning "gold" or "golden", and is consequently used to designate species of this colour. Species labelled auratus include:

The northern flicker, Colaptes auratus
The goldfish, Carassius auratus
The golden hamster, Mesocricetus auratus
A fish called the Malawi golden cichlid, Melanochromis auratus
Pagrus auratus, a fish known in Australia and New Zealand as the Snapper
A fish found in the Nile called Chrysichthys auratus
A Tasmanian fish called the golden galaxias, Galaxias auratus
The Green and Black Poison Dart Frog, Dendrobates auratus
The Madagascar starling, Hartlaubius auratus
The Levant skink, Euprepis auratus
The dogbane leaf beetle, Chrysochus auratus

See also
 Aurea (disambiguation)
 Aureus (disambiguation)

Latin words and phrases